Barynya is a fast Russian folk dance and music. The origins of the Barynya dance developed in the Eurasian region of the Central Russian Upland. The word barynya (Russian: Барыня, landlady) was used in Old Russian or Rus' lands as a form of addressing to a woman of higher class, literally when translated means “landlady”, a feminine form for the word "barin", landlord. The Barynya dance is an alternation of chastushkas and frenetic dancing. Originally the dancing was without special choreography. The main characteristics of the Barynya dance are traditional elements of Russian folk dance like Russian squatting, rotations, jumps and sprited stomping. The main instruments of Baryna are Balalaika and Garmon.

The Barynya chastushkas used to have the refrain, kind of "Барыня, барыня, сударыня-барыня", "Barynya, barynya, sudarynya-barynya", or "Барыня ты моя, сударыня ты моя". The content was often humoristic, even lewd.

There are a number of scenic, more refined versions of the dance.

A number of Russian folkloric dance ensembles bear the name.

References

External links 
mp3 sample: Click on the small icon to the left of "Barynya Music by P.Chesnokov"

Russian folk dances
Syllabus-free dance
Partial squatting position